Drop Deaf is the fourth album by the American alternative rock band MOTH. It was self-produced, and independently released in 2004.

Track listing
All songs written by Brad Stenz.
 Constantly On – 2:55
 Drop Deaf – 2:44
 I Want It All – 2:43
 Normal – 3:54
 Immune to Gravity – 2:40
 Gone – 3:14
 Three Choices – 2:28
 On Top – 3:31
 How Could You? – 3:39
 The Way I Am – 3:24

Recording process
Initial tracking took place at local studio, Group Effort, with longtime band ally, Jeff Monroe, while the remainder of the tracks were recorded at Stenz's home-based Studio Red. Stenz assumed responsibility for Drop Deaf's production chores and confesses it was "extremely stressful."

Writing and composition
Initial ideas for songs came during daily band rehearsals. While preparing for a tour with drummer Atom Willard and bassist Ted Liscinski, Gayol videotaped rehearsals and catalogued a number of possible ideas for future use.

"We really had nothing to do on a day-to-day basis except go to rehearsal, which only took up two hours of our day. That could be a good or a bad thing," Stenz laughs. "You could find a lot of spare time to get yourself in trouble, get bored or depressed. Or you could go out and write songs."

Stenz recalls the inspiration to actually start writing songs for the new album came from the unlikeliest of sources: the daughter of heavy metal high priest (and now reality TV star), Ozzy Osbourne.

"I was in a lull, nothing much to do and was asked to write some songs for the new Kelly Osbourne record," Stenz says. "I cranked out five tunes and sent them off. Later, I got a phone call saying 'We're not going to use the songs. What else do you have?' I said 'Fuck that. These songs rock, and I like these songs a lot.' So we took some of those songs and started to build from that."

"The difference is like a slap in the face," Stenz says. "Provisions was relying on four, five, or six parts on each song. Now the songs are three parts total -- verse, chorus, bridge -- and that's the payoff for me."

Credits
 Brad Stenz – vocals, guitar
 Bob Gayol – guitar
 Bill Buzeck – bass
 Kevin Hogle – drums

References

2004 albums
Moth (band) albums